Dragan Andrić may refer to:

 Dragan Andrić (politician) (born 1975), Serbian politician
 Dragan Andrić (footballer) (born 1989), Serbian footballer
 Dragan Andrić (water polo) (born 1962), Serbian water polo player
 Dragan Andrić "Andra", former bass guitar player of the Serbian band Piloti